Nicolae Dobrin Stadium is a multi-purpose stadium in Piteşti, Romania, named in 2003 after football player Nicolae Dobrin (1947–2007). It is mostly used for football matches and is the home ground of FC Argeş Piteşti.

The stadium has a capacity of 15,000 people, making it the 18th largest stadium in Romania, however the largest crowd ever recorded was of 28,000 people for the 1979–80 European Champions' Cup match between FC Argeş and Nottingham Forest. It was originally named "Stadionul 1 Mai" but changed simply to "Stadionul Municipal" immediately after the 1989 Romanian Revolution. The stadium's name was changed to Nicolae Dobrin in 2002.

Important matches
1964 – First match: FC Argeș Pitești 2–1 Bonsucesso Rio de Janeiro
1966 – FC Argeș Pitești 5–1 Toulouse
1972 – 1/8 European Champions Cup: FC Argeș Pitești 2–1 Real Madrid
1978 – 1/8 UEFA Cup: FC Argeș Pitești 2–1 Valencia
1979 – 1/16 European Champions Cup: FC Argeș Pitești 3–0 AEK Athens
1979 – 1/8 European Champions Cup: FC Argeș Pitești 1–2 Nottingham Forest
1999 – Liga I: FC Argeș Pitești 4–0 Steaua București
2009 – Liga I:  FC Argeș Pitești 5–2 Dinamo București

Gallery

References

See also
List of football stadiums in Romania

Football venues in Romania
Pitești
Multi-purpose stadiums in Romania
Buildings and structures in Argeș County